Phrom Phiram is a subdistrict in the Phrom Phiram district of Phitsanulok province, Thailand.

Geography
Phrom Phiram lies in the Nan Basin, which is part of the Chao Phraya Watershed.

Administration

References

Tambon of Phitsanulok province
Populated places in Phitsanulok province